Archduke Rainer of Austria (21 November 1895 – 25 May 1930) was a member of the House of Habsburg-Lorraine, a member of the Tuscan branch of the Imperial House of Habsburg, an Archduke of Austria and Prince of Tuscany by birth. He was the eldest son Archduke Leopold Salvator of Austria, Prince of Tuscany. He served as officer in the Austrian army during World War I.  At the fall of the Habsburg dynasty, he remained in Vienna and worked for a time as taxi driver. He died unmarried at the age of 34 from blood-poisoning.

Life
Archduke Rainer was born in Agram (the historic Austrian-German name for what is now the city of Zagreb in Croatia), the fourth child and eldest son of Archduke Leopold Salvator of Austria, Prince of Tuscany and Infanta Blanca of Spain (daughter of Carlos, Duke of Madrid). He received the names Rainer Karl Leopold Blanka Anton Margarete Beatrix Peter Joseph Raphael Michael Ignaz Stephan.

During World War I Rainer served as a lieutenant of artillery in the Austro-Hungarian Army.  After the fall of the Habsburg monarchy and the establishment of the First Austrian Republic, he renounced his rights to the Austrian throne in order that he could remain in Austria. Henceforward he used the name Rainer Habsburg. He lived in an apartment in the Palais Toskana, but also retained properties in Zagreb, and in Galicia, and at Schloss Hernstein.

In Vienna, Rainer operated a garage. He also organized a system for film reels to be transported by motorcycle from one theater to another enabling more than one theater to share the same film.

In May 1921 it was reported that there had been protests against Rainer at Schloss Hernstein. In August 1921 he was arrested in Ljubljana (then in Yugoslavia, now in Slovenia) on a charge of forging a passport.

On 6 April 1922, Rainer and his father were present at the requiem mass celebrated in St. Stephen's Cathedral in Vienna for the soul of the Emperor Charles I of Austria. They reportedly led a demonstration with cries of "Down with the Republic", and marched to the Austrian Parliament Building demanding that the flag be lowered to half-staff in honour of Austria's former sovereign.915

In 1930 Rainer died in the Wiedner Hospital in Vienna from the effects of blood poisoning; he was 35. His remains were buried in the Imperial Crypt of the Capuchin Church in Vienna. He was the first member of the Habsburg family to be buried in the crypt since the Emperor Franz Joseph I in 1916. Among those present for the funeral were his parents, Archduke Leopold Salvator and Archduchess Blanca, his father's brother Archduke Franz Salvator of Austria with his sons Hubert and Klemens, his mother's uncle Infante Alfonso Carlos of Spain and his wife Infanta Maria das Neves of Portugal, and Dr. Ignaz Seipel (former Chancellor of Austria).

In 1962 Rainer's sarcophagus was moved to the Neue Gruft (New Crypt) where it lies next to the sarcophagus of his father.

Ancestry

References
 Harding, Bertita: Lost Waltz: A Story of Exile. Bobbs-Merrill, 1944. ASIN: B0007DXCLY
 McIntosh, David: The Unknown Habsburgs. Rosvall Royal Books, 2000.

Notes

House of Habsburg-Lorraine
1895 births
1930 deaths
People from Zagreb
Austrian princes
Knights of the Golden Fleece of Austria
Burials at the Imperial Crypt